is the 8th studio album by Zard released on February 17, 1999 under B-Gram Records label.

Charting performance
The album charted #1 rank in Oricon first week. It charted for 17 weeks and sold more than 1,149,000 copies.

Track listing
All lyrics by Izumi Sakai.

Usage in media
Unmei no Roulette Mawashite: opening theme for anime television Detective Conan
Shoujo no Koro ni Modotta Mitai ni: theme song for movie Detective Conan: The Fourteenth Target
Kaze ga Toori Nukeru Machi he: commercial song of Japan Racing Association
Eien: theme song for drama A Lost Paradise
My Baby Grand ~Nukumori ga Hoshikute~: commercial song of NTT DoCoMo
Iki mo Dekinai: 2nd opening theme for Anime television Chūka Ichiban!
Atarashii Door ~Fuyu no Hajimari~: commercial song of Sapporo Brewery
Good Day: commercial song of company "Hoyu Co."
I feel fine, yeah: theme song for Fuji TV program "Mezamashi Tenki"

References 

Zard albums
1999 albums
Being Inc. albums
Japanese-language albums

Chart positions
{| class="wikitable"
!Year
!Album
!Chart
!Position
!First week sales
!Weeks
!Annual Sales
!Total Sales
!Yearly Position
|-
|1999
|Eien
|Japanese Oricon Weekly Albums Chart (Top 100)
|1
|613,130
|17
|1,149,300
|1,149,913
|19